Pegnitz is a town in the Bayreuth district in Upper Franconia, Bavaria, Germany, with a population of approximately 15,000 inhabitants.  It is also the source of the river Pegnitz. The city Bayreuth is about 27 km to the north.

The villages (Ortsteile) in Pegnitz are:

Annual events are the Christmas market, the Open-Air Rock Festival Waldstock, and above all, the seasonal strong-beer festival called Flinderer.

References

Bayreuth (district)